Aniwa Airport  is an airfield on the island of Aniwa, in the Taféa province in Vanuatu.

Facilities

Airlines and destinations

References

External links
 

Airports in Vanuatu
Tafea Province